Bonincontro Morigia (fl. 14th century) was an historical writer from Monza in northern Italy.

Life 

Born in Monza around 1295, he was a member of an important Ghibelline family of that city. He took an active part in the political struggles of his time, siding with the party of the Visconti, lords of Milan. He was also a member of the Council of the Twelve which administered the city, and on one occasion was ambassador to Venice.

He is however noted as an historian.

Main Works 
The main work of Morigia is the Chronicon Modoetiense, a history of Monza from its origins to his own day.

Morigia is the first author known to report the legend that the Latin name of Monza ("Modoetia") derives from a vision in a dream by Queen Theodelinda: a dove (symbol of the Holy Spirit) is said to have told her to found her capital on the site, bearing in it a scroll inscribed with the word "Modo" ("Now"), to which she responded "Etiam" ("Yes"). This legend inspired some of the frescoes in Monza Cathedral by the Zavattari brothers.

He was also the first biographer of Saint Gerardo dei Tintori, hospitaller and patron saint of Monza together with Saint John the Baptist. The life of Gerardo is included in the Chronicon Modoetiense, where Morigia also lists a number of miracles attributed to the saint, of one of which Morigia claims to have been an eyewitness.

References 

14th-century Italian historians
Italian politicians
People from Monza
Year of birth unknown
Year of death unknown
Italian Roman Catholics
People from Brianza